The Cabinet of Sabah is a part of the executive arm of the Government of Sabah, Malaysia. The Cabinet consists of the Chief Minister, appointed by the Governor on the basis that he is able to command a majority in the Sabah State Legislative Assembly, and 10 other ministers made up of members of the Sabah State Legislative Assembly.

This Cabinet is similar in structure and role to that of federal level, while being smaller in size. As federal and state responsibilities differ, there are a number of portfolios that differ between the federal and state governments.

Members of the Cabinet are selected by the Chief Minister, and appointed by the Governor. Cabinet Ministers are always the head of a ministry.

List of cabinets

See also 
 List of Yang di-Pertua Negeri of Sabah
 List of Chief Ministers of Sabah
 Sabah State Legislative Assembly
 Sabah State Government

References

External links 
 Sabah State Government

Politics of Sabah
Sabah